X-Men: Pryde of the X-Men (commonly known as Pryde of the X-Men) is an animated television pilot originally broadcast in 1989 on the Marvel Action Universe television block, featuring Marvel Comics' mutant superheroes of the X-Men. The pilot aired infrequently in syndication and was later released on video. It later served as the basis for Konami's X-Men arcade game.

Overview

Television pilot
The title is a pun on the name of Kitty Pryde, the youngest of the X-Men. The series that this episode was intended to launch never materialized; Marvel Productions would have to go back to the drawing board for 1992's X-Men. Funding for this pilot actually came from the budget for RoboCop: The Animated Series. Instead of making a 13th episode of RoboCop, Marvel Productions decided to use their funding to have Toei Animation produce the animation for this pilot. The pilot itself is most specifically influenced by issues #129–139 of Uncanny X-Men.

Shortly after this pilot was delivered, Marvel started having financial issues (New World Pictures, who purchased the Marvel Entertainment Group or MEG from Cadence Industries in 1986, sold MEG in January 1989 to the Andrews Group) and stopped work on just about everything but Muppet Babies. This pilot effectively marked the end of the Marvel animated universe created by DePatie–Freleng Enterprises/Marvel Productions, which began with Fantastic Four (1978) and continued with Spider-Woman (1979), Spider-Man (1981), Spider-Man and His Amazing Friends (1981) and The Incredible Hulk (1982). The X-Men themselves had previously guest starred in several episodes of Spider-Man and His Amazing Friends, although that particular series isn't necessarily in the same continuity as "Pryde of the X-Men".

Main characters
Narrated by X-Men co-creator Stan Lee, Pryde of the X-Men stars Professor X and the X-Men who were known as Cyclops, Storm, Nightcrawler, Colossus, Wolverine, Kitty Pryde, and The Dazzler saving the world from Magneto and his "Brotherhood of Mutant Terrorists" (Toad, the Blob, Pyro, Juggernaut, and the White Queen; who in addition to her telepathic abilities, displays the ability to create "psy-bolts" - sometimes called "psionic energy spears" or "psychic harpoons" - that can damage physical objects, similar to her character's powers in early comics). The X-Mansion, Danger Room, Cerebro, Blackbird, Asteroid M, and Lockheed the dragon, who was introduced as a pest on Asteroid M, are also featured.

The team lineup for the X-Men is similar to the lineup for the 1975 'All New All Different' X-Men. The chief differences are that Thunderbird, Banshee and Sunfire are not on the team in the cartoon, although they would also be the shortest lived members of the comics iteration, while Kitty Pryde and Dazzler would both join later.

Plot
The X-Men's archenemy Magneto is being transported by a military convoy. Magneto is unable to use his powers, trapped in a force field - that is, until the White Queen appears. A member of his "Brotherhood of Mutant Terrorists", she scatters the escort and dismantles the field restricting Magneto, allowing him to use his magnetic powers to tear apart his portable prison and escape.

Elsewhere, Kitty Pryde arrives at Professor Xavier's school to be trained to use her power of phasing, passing through solid matter. The Professor leads her to the Danger Room and introduces her to the X-Men: Cyclops, Colossus, Dazzler, Nightcrawler, Storm, and Wolverine. Kitty is frightened by Nightcrawler's demonic appearance and almost causes the Danger Room to go haywire, making Wolverine insist that the X-Men do not have room for children.

Magneto sends Pyro and Blob to retrieve the tracking coordinates for the Scorpio comet approaching Earth. This has the secondary goal of diverting the X-Men while Magneto and Juggernaut invade the X-Mansion. The Professor learns from Magneto's thoughts that they have come for the "mutant power circuit" of Cerebro (the mutant-tracking computer) he gives it to Kitty and orders her to flee, but Magneto manages to capture it.

The X-Men return from their confrontation with Blob and Pyro to find the mansion in ruins and the Professor and Kitty unconscious. Xavier once again reads Magneto's thoughts, this time learning the full details of his plan. Magneto plans to redirect the passing Scorpio comet onto a collision course with Earth. This would send up a cloud of dust and debris, blocking out the Sun for years, plunging the planet into another Ice Age, which would leave normal humans weakened, allowing the mutants to take over. The X-Men leave at once for Magneto's orbiting sanctuary Asteroid M, but the X-Men instruct Kitty to stay, as the mission is far too dangerous and she has not been trained. Kitty, however, wanting to prove her worth and make amends for her previous failure, phases aboard the Blackbird and hides, with the Professor's blessing.

Upon reaching the asteroid, each X-Man quickly becomes engaged with an obstacle on the way to Magneto; Storm is needed to cover the breach the X-Men blow into Asteroid M, Dazzler takes on Pyro, Wolverine traps Toad, Colossus engages Juggernaut, and Cyclops battles White Queen. Only Nightcrawler (after effortlessly teleporting past the Blob) finally confronts a gloating Magneto as the Scorpio comet is approaching Earth. As Magneto is about to blast Nightcrawler, Kitty emerges from the floor, causing Magneto to accidentally blast the wiring of his device. Nightcrawler teleports up and uses his body as a conduct, while Kitty knocks Magneto onto the platform, using his power to redirect the comet's course towards Asteroid M. Nightcrawler must risk sacrificing himself to complete the machine's circuit, or the comet will change course back to Earth.

The X-Men watch from the Blackbird for Nightcrawler to teleport at the last minute. The comet and asteroid collide, but Nightcrawler rematerializes out in space. The team attempts to retrieve him with the Blackbird's grappler arms before he burns up entering the atmosphere. They miss, and Nightcrawler disintegrates. The X-Men mourn their fallen teammate, and Kitty cries over how badly she had treated him earlier. But then coughing from one of the storage lockers reveals that Nightcrawler has just managed to teleport himself into the plane before the atmospheric compression totally burned up his suit. While the X-Men give Kitty open credit for her efforts, Wolverine insists that Kitty is not a member of the X-Men - at least not yet.

Credits

Cast

Crew

Critical response
The reaction from fans to the pilot is generally mixed. Although praised for its high quality animation, some fans simply felt that the pilot, for the most part, came across as too campy for a comic (especially under the guidance of John Byrne and Chris Claremont) with often dark and adult oriented themes like X-Men. The on-screen action sequences had to be severely curtailed for a children's cartoon show, and the episode only superficially deals with the sort of social issues often dealt with in the comics, such as isolation, intolerance, and racism.

Furthermore, purists were not fond of the way certain characters were portrayed in the pilot. For instance, Kitty Pryde was seen in their eyes as coming across as too much of a whiny damsel-in-distress (although this may have been intended to be the start of her character arc, eventually evolving into a stronger, more mature heroine). Fans also found it confusing to see the White Queen be portrayed as a member of the Brotherhood of Mutants. This Brotherhood was a mix of Magneto's group (with the inclusion of Toad) and Mystique's (with the inclusion of Pyro and the Blob) along with the previously unaffiliated Juggernaut and White Queen.

Some fans were upset to hear the Canadian Wolverine speaking with what seemed to be an Australian accent.  According to Rick Holberg (as taken directly from the book X-Men: The Characters and Their Universe), storyboard artist and finalizer for Pryde of the X-Men and Spider-Man and His Amazing Friends:

Despite Holberg's recollection, Wolverine had been established as a Canadian character since the first issue of Giant-Size X-Men, published in 1975. The animal he is named after is not found in Australia. By 1988, the second volume of Wolverine (a monthly book) was being published and was well established that the character was Canadian in the Wolverine monthly series, the Uncanny X-Men book, the Classic X-Men (reprints with new material added), and the X-Men spin-off comic, Alpha Flight, which was first published in 1983. There is no evidence that there was ever any plan by Len Wein, Roy Thomas, John Romita Sr., Chris Claremont, John Byrne, Dave Cochrum, or even Stan Lee to make Wolverine an "Australian expatriate".

The confusion may have been due in part to English-born author Chris Claremont's tendency to pepper the character's dialogue with colloquialisms from the UK which are also common to Australia.  Wolverine's previous animated appearances, in Spider-Man and His Amazing Friends, also featured him with an Australian or English accent.

Tie-ins

Graphic novels
In 1990, Marvel published a graphic novel titled X-Men Animation Special, an adaptation of Pryde of the X-Men that featured film images of cel animation from the cartoon rather than original art.

Video games
In 1989, X-Men: Madness in Murderworld, simply known as X-Men, was released for DOS, Commodore 64, and Amiga computer systems. It was developed and published by Paragon Software in 1989 and featured the cast of Pryde of the X-Men. It was a side-scroller with puzzles set in Murderworld. A limited edition comic book was included.

In 1990, LJN released The Uncanny X-Men for the Nintendo Entertainment System, featuring a near exact lineup of the team from this cartoon, only swapping out Dazzler for Iceman. The game received negative reviews, and was named one of the worst superhero games of all-time by Seanbaby.

In 1992, Konami produced an X-Men arcade game based on the Pryde of the X-Men pilot. Up to six players choose from six X-Men: Cyclops, Colossus, Wolverine, Storm, Nightcrawler, or Dazzler. Their objective is to stop the villain Magneto from wreaking havoc on human civilization. They must fight through an army of human-sized Sentinels and supervillains such as Pyro, Blob, Wendigo, Nimrod, The White Queen, Juggernaut, and Mystique. Later, Magneto kidnaps Professor X and Kitty Pryde, prompting the heroes to go on a rescue mission. The heroes fight their way to Island M and ultimately to Magneto's base on Asteroid M, where the final battle with Magneto takes place.

References

External links

1989 American television episodes
Marvel Action Universe
Television pilots not picked up as a series
X-Men television series
Television series by Marvel Productions
Animated television series based on Marvel Comics
Toei Animation television